Ronaldo Lomeli (born February 18, 1998) is an American soccer player who most recently played for Forward Madison in USL League One.

Career

Youth
Lomeli played with local USSDA side FC Golden State in California. He helped the club to a U-18 National League Blue runner up position.

College & Amateur
Lomeli attended San Jose State University in 2016 to play college soccer, where he went on to make 16 appearances for the Spartans. In 2018, Lomeli transferred to the University of California, Riverside, where he scored 2 goals in 26 appearances for the Highlanders.

In 2018, Sukow also appeared for NPSL side Kitsap Pumas, and in 2019 with USL League Two side Orange County SC U23.

Professional
On May 5, 2021, Lomeli signed his first professional contract with USL League One side Forward Madison following a successful trial. He made his professional debut on May 8, 2021, starting in a 1–1 draw with FC Tucson.

Personal
Ronaldo's brother, Romario, also played soccer at the University of California, Riverside, and currently plays for NISA side San Diego 1904 FC.

References

1998 births
Living people
American soccer players
Association football defenders
San Jose State Spartans men's soccer players
UC Riverside Highlanders men's soccer players
Kitsap Pumas players
Orange County SC U-23 players
Forward Madison FC players
Soccer players from California
People from Sherman Oaks, Los Angeles
National Premier Soccer League players
USL League One players
USL League Two players